John Craigie (25 August 1866 – 13 October 1948) was an Australian cricketer. He played two first-class matches for South Australia in 1887/88.

See also
 List of South Australian representative cricketers

References

External links
 

1866 births
1948 deaths
Australian cricketers
South Australia cricketers
Cricketers from Adelaide